Iúri Gabriel Dantas Leitão (born 3 July 1998) is a Portuguese road and track cyclist, who currently rides for UCI ProTeam . He competed in the 2020 UCI Track Cycling World Championships.

Major results

Track

2016
 1st  Points race, National Junior Championships
2018
 3rd Scratch, National Championships
2019
 3rd Madison, National Championships
2020
 UEC European Championships
1st  Scratch
2nd  Elimination race
3rd  Omnium
 National Championships
1st  Scratch
2nd Individual pursuit
2nd Points race
 UEC European Under-23 Championships
2nd  Scratch
2nd  Points race
2nd  Elimination race
2021
 National Championships
1st  Madison
1st  Omnium
 UCI Champions League
1st Elimination race, London
2nd Scratch, Palma
 2nd  Elimination race, UCI World Championships
 UEC European Championships
2nd  Points race
3rd  Madison (with Rui Oliveira)
 UCI Nations Cup, St. Petersburg
2nd Madison
2nd Omnium
2022
 1st  Scratch, UEC European Championships
 National Championships
1st  Scratch
1st  Madison
2nd Omnium

Road

2018
 1st Stage 5 Volta a Portugal do Futuro
2021
 Volta ao Alentejo
 Sprints classification
1st Stages 2 & 3 
2022
 6th Overall Ronde de l'Oise
1st Stage 2

References

External links

1998 births
Living people
Portuguese male cyclists
Portuguese track cyclists
People from Viana do Castelo
Sportspeople from Viana do Castelo District